Memories and Vagaries is a collection of short memoirs and essays by Axel Munthe published in several languages and editions, with differing contents and ordering.

A few of the pieces were published in various magazines, and favorable responses convinced Munthe to publish the collection. Known magazine publications include Toys (or Toys From the Paris Horizon) in Blackwood, and For Those Who Love Music in Murray's Magazine.

First edition
It was first published under the title Vagaries in 1898 in London by the John Murray Publishing House. The first edition is now in the public domain.

The contents of the first edition are:
 Instead of a Preface
 Toys
 For Those Who Love Music
 Political Agitations in Capri
 Menagerie
 Italy in Paris
 Blackcock-Shooting
 To -
 Monsieur Alfredo
 Mont Blanc, King of the Mountains
 Raffaella
 The Dogs in Capri, An Interior
 Zoology
 Hypochondria
 La Madonna del Buon Camminone

Second edition
A second edition was published in 1908, retitled Memories and Vagaries.

Third edition
In 1930, a third edition was published, with a new preface and somewhat different contents, and the titles of several pieces altered. Its contents are:
 Preface
 For Those Who Love Music
 Toys From the Paris Horizon  (called "Toys" in the first edition)
 Monsieur Alfredo
 Italy in Paris
 Raffaella
 Mont Blanc, King of the Mountains
 Menagerie
 Zoology
 A Cry in the Wilderness
 Political Agitations in Capri
 The Dogs in Capri
 Soeur Philomène
 When Tappio Was Lost
 La Madonna del Buon Cammino
 Porta San Paolo
 Instead of a Preface

It was reprinted at least ten more times between 1930 and 1947.

Small press
In 1916, Horace Carr of Cleveland published an edition of 200 copies of To - on French handmade paper.
 
In 1925, a limited edition of 221 copies of Vagaries by Munthe were published for Violet and Hal W. Trovillion at the Herrin News Shop in Herrin, Illinois.. This contained Rafaella, Toys From the Paris Horizon, and For Those Who Love Music.

Translations
Memories and Vagaries seems to have very different titles in other languages, often being titled roughly An Old Book of Man and Beasts.
 En gammal bok om människor och djur, Stockholm, 1931
 Ein altes Buch von Menschen und Tieren, Leipzig, 1934
 Hommes et Betes, Paris, 1937
 Homens e Bichos, Portuguese translation by António Sérgio, 1937
 Oud boek van menschen en dieren
 Hombres y bestias, Spanish translation by Pierre dy Resckuin
 Vagabondaggio, Milan, 1933, is quite possibly also a translation of this work.

Summaries

 Instead of a Preface discusses the author's reasons for publication.
 Preface (1930) discusses the reasons for the revised edition, and notes the inclusion of several pieces that are also incorporated into The Story of San Michele
 For Those Who Love Music concerns an impoverished organ grinder and his monkey.
 Toys From the Paris Horizon is a whimsical comparison of dolls from various nations, particularly in terms of the competition between the German and French toy industries.
 Blackcock-shooting is an exhortation against cruel animal trapping practices and unnecessary hunting and slaughter of animals, combined with a memoir of a hunting expedition.
 Monsieur Alfredo depicts a down-at-the-heels playwright and drama teacher.
 Italy in Paris is an account of an impoverished Italian family with a sick child living in Paris.
 Rafaella tells the story of a young Italian artist's model in Paris.
 Mont Blanc, King of the Mountains is an account of a mountain climbing expedition, with the mountains and weather being highly personified.
 Menagerie describes an exhibition of animals.
 A Cry in the Wilderness is a brief essay on animal rights and human cultural evolution.
 Political Agitations in Capri is an anecdote concerning German tourists on Capri.
 The Dogs of Capri talks of the politics of the dogs on Capri, particularly as related to the social divisions of their owners.
 Souer Philomène describes a religious sister serving as a nurse in a Paris hospital while Munthe was a medical student there.
 When Tappio Was Lost is an account of some events involving Munthe that took place during the cholera epidemic in Naples in 1884.
 La Madonna de Buon Cammino is another account from the Naples cholera epidemic of 1884, concerning a priest and his shrine.
 Porta San Paolo describes the Protestant Cemetery in Rome and includes meditations on death. 
 To - describes the friendship and uncomplaining nature of the author's dog, and is something of a commentary on human morals.

External links
 

1898 non-fiction books
1908 non-fiction books
1930 non-fiction books
Cholera outbreaks
Essay collections